Pétur Guðmundsson (born 9 March 1962) is a retired male shot putter from Iceland, who represented his native country at the 1988 Summer Olympics and 1992 Summer Olympics. His personal best is 21.26 metres, thrown on 10 November 1990 in Mosfellsbær.

Competition record

References
sports-reference
 IAAF Profile

1962 births
Living people
Petur Gudmundsson
Athletes (track and field) at the 1988 Summer Olympics
Athletes (track and field) at the 1992 Summer Olympics
Petur Gudmundsson
World Athletics Championships athletes for Iceland